is a Jamaican football club, which currently plays in the third tier KSAFA Super League.  The team is based in Constant Spring, St Andrew, which may be regarded as suburb of the capital Kingston. They play their home games at Constant Spring Sports Ground.

The club was founded in the mid 20th century under the name "Golden Aces".

The team last played in the Premier League in the 2005–06 season.

Achievements

National Premier League
Runners-up(1): 1994–95

National A League (Currently KSAFA Super League)
Champions(1): 1999–00

KSAFA Major League

Champions(4): 1987–88, 1990–91, 1992–93, 2017–18

Jackie Bell Knockout Competition
Winners(2): 1987–88, 1999–00
Runners-up(1): 2000–01

Year-by-year

Rivalries
The nearest clubs to Constant Spring are Shortwood United, Barbican and Stony Hill.

Spring's fiercest rivalry is with Shortwood United, both clubs only being separated by roughly 1,000 yards. Spring have been the bigger of the two teams over the years but after being relegated to the Major League in the 2011/2012 season from the Super League, Shortwood were promoted the other way.

The rivalry between Spring and Stony Hill is a more mellow fixture.  Spring is a feeder club to Stony Hill for players at the zenith of their career or those who are looking for another local club.  This always makes for an interesting encounter when the two face each other.

References

RSSSF

JFDB

Football clubs in Jamaica